Seyed Mehdi Bazargarde Shalkohimojarad (born 16 March 1979, Tehran, Iran) is an Iranian volleyball player who plays for Shahrdari Urmia.

References

External links
FIVB profile
 

Sportspeople from Tehran
Iranian men's volleyball players
1979 births
Living people
People from Rasht
Islamic Solidarity Games competitors for Iran